Pachyceramyia is a genus of house flies, insects in the family Muscidae. There are about six described species in Pachyceramyia.

Species
 Pachyceramyia cordyluroides (Atein, 1898)
 Pachyceramyia littoralis (Malloch, 1917)
 Pachyceramyia longispina (Malloch, 1923)
 Pachyceramyia mallitosa (Huckett, 1936)
 Pachyceramyia parvimaculata (Stein, 1920)
 Pachyceramyia robusta (Johnson, 1917)

References

Further reading

External links

 

Muscidae genera